"All My Love" is a song by American EDM trio Cash Cash featuring British singer-songwriter Conor Maynard. It was released on July 7, 2017 by Big Beat.

Background
Cash Cash said of teaming up with Maynard: “Making ‘All My Love’ with Conor was a very natural collaboration,” and group added: “We attached the production with a hyped energetic feel to give some contrast to the lyrics and we’re very pleased with the way they complimented each other. The emotion in his voice really brought out the concept of the song and gave us chills when we first listened back.”

Music video
The video was published on October 5, 2017. A woman consoles her heartbroken friend with ice cream, takeout and a sexy girls’ night in, with pizza, burgers and sweets.
And Jean, Alex and Sam make cameos as delivery boys, while Maynard plays a snubbed suitor.

Charts

Weekly charts

Year-end charts

References

2017 singles
2017 songs
Conor Maynard songs
Cash Cash songs
Big Beat Records (American record label) singles